The Committee on the Biological Effects of Ionizing Radiation (BEIR) is a committee of the American National Research Council. It publishes reports on the effects of ionizing radiation.

References

Medical imaging organizations
Nuclear medicine organizations